BioHazard is a combat robot built by rocket scientist Carlo Bertocchini. It was the most successful robot in the heavyweight division of BattleBots. BioHazard's weapon is an electric four-bar lifting arm (technically, an asymmetric linear actuator) used to lift other robots. The lifting arm has been described as a type of shovel, scoop, or a forklift mechanism. For much of its reign, BioHazard was notorious for being difficult to attack and get under due to hinged titanium wedge skirts on all sides and the low profile effected by its  height.

It originally competed in the U.S. Robot Wars where it won two heavyweight division titles. It went on to win four BattleBots championships.  Overall, it won three out of four seasons on the television show BattleBots on Comedy Central. Its first significant title was won in 1996. BioHazard initially retired in 2002 with a record of 37 head-to-head wins and three losses.

BioHazard returned to competition in the ComBots Cup in 2005.  The increased power and development of heavyweight spinner robots prevailed, with BioHazard finishing poorly with one win (a forfeit over Jawbreaker, who was destroyed by Eugene in its first fight) and two losses (one loss to Megabyte in 2:15 by tap out; one forfeit and a final loss to Brutality in 1:21). Paul Ventimiglia, builder of Brutality, had given Carlo an extended postponement while Carlo drove BioHazard back to his shop to repair it after its loss to Megabyte. Ventimiglia cited Carlo Bertocchini as the inspiration for his interest in building combat robots. BioHazard was still heavily damaged by the time of their match.

References

External links 
 http://battlekits.com/biohazard_battlebots.htm
 BioHazard's Fight History at BotRank

BattleBots competitors
Robot Fighting League
Robots of the United States
Rolling robots
1996 robots